Asunaprevir (formerly BMS-650032, brand name in Japan and Russia Sunvepra) is an experimental drug candidate for the treatment of hepatitis C. It was undergoing development by Bristol-Myers Squibb and has completed Phase III clinical trials in 2013.

Asunaprevir is an inhibitor of the hepatitis C virus enzyme serine protease NS3.Asunaprevir is being tested in combination with pegylated interferon and ribavirin, as well as in interferon-free regimens with other direct-acting antiviral agents including daclatasvir.

See also
 Boceprevir
 Telaprevir

References

Carbamates
Chloroarenes
Cyclopropanes
CYP2D6 inhibitors
Experimental drugs
Isoquinolines
NS3/4A protease inhibitors
Pyrrolidines
Sulfonamides
Tert-butyl compounds